Leonidas is a sculpture of a hoplite made of Parian marble in 480–470 BC and unearthed in 1926. The sculpture was dubbed "Leonidas" by a local Greek workman after its discovery, in reference to Spartan king Leonidas I. It was found southwest of peribolos of the sanctuary of Athena Chalkioikos on the Acropolis of Sparta. The sculpture is housed in the Archaeological Museum of Sparta, which acquired it from the British School at Athens in 1926. The sculpture features a Corinthian helmet with ram-shaped cheek pieces. While most of the plume is a restoration, fragments of a leg, foot, shield and helmet were also found nearby. 

The sculpture was part of a group, probably affixed to the sanctuary pediment. According to several scholars, it formed part of the memorial on the Spartan acropolis to honor Leonidas on his reburial. Paul Cartledge, however, argued it would have represented a mythical hero or a god rather than the historical person of Leonidas. One estimation dates the sculpture before rather than after 480 BC, the year of the Battle of Thermopylae where Leonidas died.

References

1926 archaeological discoveries
5th-century BC Greek sculptures
Ancient Greek military art
Marble sculptures in Greece
Military history of Sparta
Sculptures of men in Greece
Leonidas I